Churchill Caldom Cambreleng (October 24, 1786 – April 30, 1862) was an American businessman and politician from New York.  He is notable for his service in the United States House of Representatives from 1821 to 1839, including terms as chairman of several high-profile committees.  In addition, he served as U.S. Minister to Russia from 1840 to 1841.

Life

C. C. Cambreleng was born in Washington, Beaufort County, North Carolina on October 24, 1786, the son of Stephen Cambreleng and Ann (Patten) Cambreleng. He attended school in New Bern, North Carolina, and moved to New York City in 1802.

Intending to begin a career as a businessman, Cambreleng worked as a clerk in a mercantile counting room. In 1806 he moved to Providence, Rhode Island, where he was the chief clerk for a merchant with interests in the Pacific Northwest. After the death of his employer, Cambreleng intended to pursue a business opportunity in New Orleans, but was unable to remain there because of ongoing combat during the War of 1812.

He then returned to New York City, where he was employed by John Jacob Astor. Cambreleng traveled throughout Europe and Asia while handling commercial opportunities for himself and Astor, and he eventually became wealthy as a result of his business success.

Cambreleng was elected as a Democratic-Republican to the 17th, and was re-elected as a Crawford Democratic-Republican to the 18th, as a Jacksonian to the 19th, 20th, 21st, 22nd, 23rd and 24th, and as a Democrat to the 25th United States Congress, holding office from December 3, 1821 to March 3, 1839. He was Chairman of the Commerce Committee (20th to 22nd Congresses), Foreign Affairs Committee (23rd Congress) and Ways and Means Committee (24th and 25th Congresses).

Upon its incorporation in 1831, he became the first President of the Saratoga and Schenectady Railroad.

President Martin Van Buren appointed him United States Minister to Russia in 1840 and he served until 1841. He was a delegate from Suffolk County to the New York State Constitutional Convention of 1846.

He attended the 1848 Democratic National Convention in Baltimore as a Barnburner but withdrew with his faction, and participated in the nomination of Van Buren as the candidate of the Free Soil Party. Later he rejoined the Democrats and supported Franklin Pierce for president in 1852.

Death and burial
Cambreleng died in West Neck, Suffolk County, New York on April 30, 1862.  He was buried at Brooklyn's Green-Wood Cemetery, Section 73, Lot 4150.

Family
In 1835, Cambreleng married Phebe Glover, the daughter of New York City merchant John J. Glover. They remained married until Cambreleng's death, and had no children.

References

Sources

Books

Internet

Magazines

External links

House Ways and Means Committee
Biography at NC Gen Web

1786 births
1862 deaths
Ambassadors of the United States to Russia
People from Washington, North Carolina
New York (state) Democratic-Republicans
Politicians from New York City
19th-century American railroad executives
People from Huntington, New York
New York (state) Free Soilers
Burials at Green-Wood Cemetery
Politicians from New Bern, North Carolina
19th-century American diplomats
Democratic-Republican Party members of the United States House of Representatives
Jacksonian members of the United States House of Representatives from New York (state)
Democratic Party members of the United States House of Representatives from New York (state)
19th-century American politicians